Natalliah Whyte (born 9 August 1997) is a Jamaican track and field athlete who specializes in sprint. She represented the Jamaica at the 2019 World Athletics Championships, winning a gold medal in 4 × 100 metres relay.

In 2014, she competed in the girls' 200 metres event at the 2014 Summer Youth Olympics held in Nanjing, China.

Career
She won gold with team Jamaica in the women's 4 × 100 metres relay at the 2019 World Championships, and was also a 100 metres finalist.

She attended Auburn University, competing for the Auburn Tigers from 2017 to 2018, before transferring to Florida Atlantic University. She now trains at MVP International in Florida, an extension of the Jamaica-based MVP Track Club. She is coached by Henry Rolle who originally recruited her to Auburn.

References

External links

 

1997 births
Living people
Jamaican female sprinters
Athletes (track and field) at the 2014 Summer Youth Olympics
Auburn Tigers women's track and field athletes
Florida Atlantic Owls athletes
World Athletics Championships athletes for Jamaica
World Athletics Championships medalists
World Athletics Championships winners
Youth Olympic gold medalists for Jamaica
Youth Olympic gold medalists in athletics (track and field)
20th-century Jamaican women
21st-century Jamaican women
Athletes (track and field) at the 2022 Commonwealth Games
Commonwealth Games bronze medallists for Jamaica
Commonwealth Games medallists in athletics
Medallists at the 2022 Commonwealth Games